literally means tenth street in Japanese.  It may also refer to:

 Jūjō, Tokyo, a district in Kita-ku, Tokyo, Japan
 Jūjō Station (Tokyo), a train station on the JR East Saikyō Line in Kita-ku, Tokyo
 , one of several numbered east–west streets in Kyoto, Japan
 Jūjō Station (Kyoto Municipal Subway), a train station on the Kyoto Municipal Subway Karasuma Line in Minami-ku, Kyoto
 Jūjō Station (Kintetsu), a train station on the Kintetsu Kyoto Line in Minami-ku, Kyoto